Big Cats with Nigel Marven was a one-hour nature documentary presented by Nigel Marven and first broadcast on ITV in 2001.

Nigel Marven's mission is to meet all five big cats that can roar: leopard, snow leopard, jaguar, lion and tiger.

External links 
 

Nature educational television series